Cyrus Edwards (June 17, 1793 – August 31, 1877) was an American lawyer and politician.

Edwards was born in Montgomery County, Maryland. He moved with his family to Kentucky. Edwards studied law and was admitted to the Illinois bar in Kaskaskia, Illinois Territory. His brother Ninian Edwards was Governor of Illinois Territory. He practiced law in Potosi, Missouri and Elkton, Kentucky. Edwards served in the Black Hawk War as an officer. He moved to Edwardsville, Illinois. Edwards served in the Illinois House of Representatives in 1832 and 1840 and in the Illinois Senate in 1834. Edwards served in the Illinois Constitutional Convention of 1847. Edwards was a member of the Whig Party. Edwards lived in Upper Alton, Illinois and continued to practice law and was a farmer. During the American Civil War, Edwards supported the Republican. In 1838, Edwards ran for the office of Governor of Illinois and lost the election. Edwards died in Alton, Illinois.

Notes

1793 births
1877 deaths
People from Montgomery County, Maryland
People from Edwardsville, Illinois
People from Alton, Illinois
American people of the Black Hawk War
People of Illinois in the American Civil War
Farmers from Illinois
Illinois lawyers
Kentucky lawyers
Missouri lawyers
Illinois Republicans
Illinois Whigs
Members of the Illinois House of Representatives
Illinois state senators
19th-century American lawyers
Beall family of Maryland